The London Buddhist Centre (LBC) is a temple in Bethnal Green in East London, is the main base for the London Triratna Buddhist Community, formerly known as the Friends of the Western Buddhist Order. It opened in 1978, and is located in an ornate, vernacular redbrick Victorian fire station, completed in 1888, and in use by the London fire service until 1969. The building was fire-damaged in the 1970s, before being renovated by volunteers for its current use. Further major improvements were completed in 2009.

The centre teaches meditation and Buddhism and offers drop-in lunchtime meditation sessions Monday-Saturday, and evening sessions on Tuesdays and Wednesdays, open to beginners. The centre also explores the teaching of the Buddha (dharma) and its relevance in today's society through seminars, courses, classes and retreats. Regular retreats are run at its retreat centre in Suffolk, Vajrasana.

In addition to this the centre also runs courses and retreats using mindfulness based cognitive therapy approaches. Its courses for depression, based on the mindfulness-based cognitive behavioral therapy methodology of Jon Kabat-Zinn at the University of Massachusetts Medical School, featured in the Financial Times in 2008.  This initiative is supported by the local authority, the London borough of Tower Hamlets. The Times has also reported on the centre's work with those affected by alcohol dependency 

The building's ground floor areas include a library, bookshop and reception room, with painted murals, as well as two ornate shrine rooms with Buddha figures, or "rupas", sculpted by Chintamani, a member of the Triratna Buddhist Order. A third, basement, room for meditation and classes, primarily used by a project called "Breathing Space", opened in 2009. The building's upper floors house Buddhist residential communities.

The LBC is a UK-registered charity (255420), and is part of a local network of Buddhist businesses and organisations within the Bethnal Green area. This includes Buddhist communities, a charity shop and an arts centre.

The former fire station is a Grade II listed building.

References

External links
London Buddhist Centre website

Religion in the London Borough of Tower Hamlets
Buddhist temples in London
Buddhist organisations based in the United Kingdom
Grade II listed buildings in the London Borough of Tower Hamlets
Grade II listed religious buildings and structures
Bethnal Green